Gheorghe Tulba (born 19 November 1960) is a Romanian former footballer who played as a forward.

Honours
Maramureș Baia Mare
Divizia B: 1977–78, 1982–83
Debrecen
Nemzeti Bajnokság II: 1992–93

References

1960 births
Living people
Romanian footballers
Association football forwards
Liga I players
Liga II players
Nemzeti Bajnokság I players
Nemzeti Bajnokság II players
CS Minaur Baia Mare (football) players
FC Dinamo București players
FC Olt Scornicești players
Debreceni VSC players
Romanian expatriate footballers
Expatriate footballers in Hungary
Romanian expatriate sportspeople in Hungary